Lipkea is a genus of  stalked jellyfish. It is the only genus in the monotypic family Lipkeidae. Lipkea species lack tentacles at the end of their bell.

Genera and Species
According to the World Register of Marine Species, there are only three described species in this family and genus:

Lipkea ruspoliana Vogt, 1886
Lipkea stephensoni Carlgren, 1933
Lipkea sturdzi (Antipa, 1893)

Distribution
According to the World Register of Marine Species L. stephensoni is the only species known from the waters off the coast of South Africa. The other Lipkea species (Lipkea ruspoliana and Lipkea sturdzi) are found in the mediterranean sea. It is likely that there are undescribed specimens of Lipkea. For instance the images in the gallery below show Lipkea with dense nematocyst clusters (white spots) distributed throughout the oral surface, which are not characteristic of previous descriptions for the three described Lipkea.

Gallery

References

Lipkeidae
Medusozoa genera